Emil and the Detectives is a 1964 American crime comedy film directed by Peter Tewksbury based on the novel Emil and the Detectives by German author Erich Kästner. The film stars Walter Slezak and Bryan Russell.

It was shot at the Tempelhof Studios in Berlin and on location around the city. The sets were designed by the art directors Isabella and Werner Schlichting.

Plot
Ten-year old Emil Tischbein travels by bus from Neustadt to Berlin, carrying an envelope containing 400 marks that his mother has entrusted him to deliver to his grandmother. Emil falls asleep during the bus ride and wakes up to find the money gone. He is sure that the thief is Grundeis, the shifty man who was sitting next to him. Emil follows Grundeis to a Berlin cafe and summons a policeman, but Grundeis escapes to a rendezvous with The Baron, his underworld associate. Emil enlists the help of a group of child "detectives" led by the street urchin Gustav, and together they track down Grundeis and overhear him plotting with The Baron and his accomplice Müller to rob a large Berlin bank by tunneling to its vault. Emil is captured and forced to assist in the criminal plot. After the bank vault is blown open, Grundeis is doublecrossed by The Baron and Müller and left behind with Emil in the tunnel to be blown up by a dynamite fuse, but Gustav arrives in time to save them. The child detectives pursue the thieves and alert more children in the neighborhood who also give chase. The Baron and Muller are surrounded by the children and arrested by the police. Emil receives a reward which he intends to share with the other children.

Cast
Walter Slezak as The Baron
Bryan Russell as Emil Tischbein
Roger Mobley as Gustav
Cindy Cassell as Pony 
Heinz Schubert as Grundeis the thief
Peter Ehrlich as Müller
Elsa Wagner as Grandma
Eva Ingeborg Scholz as Frau Tischbein, Emil's mother
Wolfgang Völz as Wachtmeister Stucke
Brian Richardson as The Professor
Robert Swann as Hermann
David Petrychka as Dienstag

Reception
Eugene Archer of The New York Times wrote that "Walt Disney has come up with one of his best children's pictures," stating that Tewksbury's direction "makes all the difference. He has kept the kiddies from gushing too coyly, suppressed the mugging of a comic trio of thieves, photographed the fresh Berlin setting in effective color, and juxtaposed suspense and wit with a nice, bouncing pace." Variety called the film "an interesting project" with "the customary distinguishable Disney mark to give it class," but without the same appeal to adults as "say, Disney's previous moppet classic, 'Mary Poppins.'" Philip K. Scheuer of the Los Angeles Times wrote that the film "falls somewhere between the moppet trade and not-too-discriminating adults."<ref>Scheuer, Philip K. (December 21, 1964). "Emil and the Detectives". Los Angeles Times'. Part III, p. 11.</ref> The Monthly Film Bulletin found it "pleasantly presented, if without any distinction."

Comic book adaption
 Gold Key: Emil and the Detectives'' (February 1965)

References

External links
 
 
 

1964 films
Films based on children's books
Films based on German novels
Films based on works by Erich Kästner
Films directed by Peter Tewksbury
Films produced by Walt Disney
1964 crime films
Walt Disney Pictures films
American remakes of German films
Films adapted into comics
Films set in West Germany
Films set in Berlin
Films shot in Berlin
Films shot at Tempelhof Studios
1960s English-language films